John Watkins may refer to:

Politicians 
 John Watkins (mayor) (died 1812), mayor of New Orleans
 John D. Watkins (1828–1895), American politician in Louisiana
 John T. Watkins (1854–1925), American politician, U.S. Representative from Louisiana
 John Watkins (Virginia politician, born 1947), Virginia state senator
 John Watkins (Australian politician) (born 1955), in New South Wales
 John A. Watkins (politician) (1898–1973), politician from the U.S. state of Indiana
 John B. Watkins (1855–1931), politician in the Virginia Senate
 John Lloyd Vaughan Watkins, Welsh politician

Sportsmen 
 John Watkins (baseball) (1857–1924), American pre-Negro leagues baseball catcher and manager
 John Watkins (South African cricketer) (1923–2021), South African cricketer
 John Watkins (Australian cricketer) (born 1943), Australian cricketer

Others 
 John Watkins (architect) (1834–1902), architect in Utah
 John W. N. Watkins (1924–1999), English philosopher
 John Watkins (diplomat) (1902–1964), Canadian diplomat and ambassador
 John Watkins (photographer) (1823–1874), English portrait photographer
 John Watkins (writer) (fl. 1792–1831), English writer known as a biographer
 John A. Watkins (admiral), United States Navy admiral
 John G. Watkins (1913–2012), American psychologist
 J. Elfreth Watkins (1852–1903), curator at the United States National Museum
 John M. Watkins, founder of Watkins Books
 J. S. Watkins (John Samuel Watkins, 1866–1942), Australian art teacher

See also
 Jack Watkins (1893–1974), Australian rugby league footballer
 Jonathan Watkins (born 1957), English curator
 Watkins v. United States, U.S. Supreme Court decision (1957)